The Royal College of Radiologists (RCR) is the professional body responsible for the specialties of clinical oncology and clinical radiology throughout the United Kingdom. Its role is to advance the science and practice of radiology and oncology, further public education and set appropriate professional standards of practice. The College sets and monitors the educational curriculum for those training to enter the profession, and administers the Fellowship of the Royal College of Radiologists exams. It is a registered charity in the United Kingdom (no. 211540).

The RCR has 2 faculties, representing Clinical Oncology and Clinical Radiology. It publishes two academic journals, Clinical Oncology and Clinical Radiology.

The RCR has been based at 63 Lincoln's Inn Fields in London since July 2013.

History

A series of bodies has represented practitioners of radiological medicine in the UK, starting in 1897 with the foundation of the Roentgen Society (named for the physicist Wilhelm Conrad Röntgen). Subsequently, the British Association of Radiologists was founded in 1934. In 1935 The Society of Radiotherapists of Great Britain and Ireland was set up for doctors specialising in the treatment of cancers using X-rays and radium. The latter two bodies amalgamated in 1939 to form the Faculty of Radiologists, which was granted a Royal Charter in 1953. In 1975 a Supplemental Charter was granted, and the Faculty became the Royal College of Radiologists.

In 1950 the first issue of the Clinical Radiology Journal was published by the Faculty of Radiologists.  The first issue of Clinical Oncology was published in September 1989.

In May 2021, the RCR launched the first national radiotherapy consent forms to help standardise and strengthen the informed consent process for adult cancer patients undergoing radiotherapy. Standardised consent forms with tailored information regarding radiotherapy for different tumour sites were released, and digital versions developed in collaboration with digital consent company Concentric Health. Welsh language versions of the consent forms were published in June 2022.

Fellowship of Royal College of Radiologist Examinations 

Candidates are examined against the Specialty Training Curriculum for Clinical Radiology. The specialty trainees are expected to complete their First FRCR examination before progressing to ST2. During their ST3 training year they are expected to pass the Final FRCR Part A examination, and must complete this before progressing to ST4. During ST4, trainees are expected to pass the Final FRCR Part B examination.

First FRCR examination 

The fellowship examinations start at the beginning of the Specialty Training Year 1 (ST1). The First FRCR examination expects candidates to have gained a knowledge of the physical principles that underpin diagnostic medical imaging and of the anatomy needed to perform and interpret radiological studies. The First FRCR examination comprises two modules: Physics and Anatomy. The anatomy modules is a 90-minute exam comprising 100 images, where each image has several annotations, each of which in turn has a single related question. The physics module is a 120-minute multiple choice question paper comprising 40 questions, each with five true or false answers.

Final FRCR Part A examination 

The Final FRCR Part A examination comprises single best answers, split into two separate papers for the purposes of delivery. Each paper contains 120 questions and examining candidates on all aspects of clinical radiology and the basic sciences of physics, anatomy and techniques.

The main areas examined are:

1. Cardiothoracic and Vascular

2. Musculoskeletal and Trauma

3. Gastro-intestinal

4. Genito-urinary, Adrenal, Obstetrics & Gynaecology and Breast

5. Paediatric

6. Central Nervous and Head & Neck

Final FRCR Part B examination 

During the ST4 training, the specialty trainees are expected to complete the Final FRCR Part B. The Final FRCR (Part B) examination consists of a reporting session, a rapid reporting session and an oral examination.

The extensive examination provided by the RCR ensures a high quality and standard of radiology consultants. It has been deemed as one of the hardest examinations in the medical profession, along with the FRCA and FRCPath.

List of Fellows

 Moya Cole
 Dr. K.A. Dinshaw
 Adrian Dixon
 Frank Ellis
 Janet Husband
 M. Krishnan Nair
 James Ralston Kennedy Paterson
 Kakarla Subba Rao
 Robert Twycross
 Joanna Wardlaw
 Syed Junaid
 Brian Hayes
 Pankaj Nagori

See also
 Society and College of Radiographers

References

External links
 Royal College of Radiologists official website
 RCR Past prizes, awards and Fellowships.

Health in the London Borough of Camden
Medical associations based in the United Kingdom
Organisations based in the London Borough of Camden
Radiology organizations
Radiologists
1939 establishments in the United Kingdom